Governor Price may refer to:

Henry Bertram Price (1869–1941), 30th Naval Governor of Guam
James Hubert Price (1878–1943), 53rd Governor of Virginia
John Giles Price (1808–1857), Governor of the convict settlement at Norfolk Island from 1846 to 1853
Rodman M. Price (1816–1894), 17th Governor of New Jersey
Sterling Price (1809–1867), 11th Governor of Missouri